The installed capacity of wind power in Hungary was 329 MW as of April 2011. Most of wind farms are in the Kisalföld region.

As of 1 April 2011, there were 39 operational wind farms in Hungary, with 172 turbines and 329 MW of installed capacity.

Installed capacity

Cumulative PV capacity in megawatt-peak (MWp) since 2002

Tenders
The first tender was written in 2006 and it contains 330 MW capacity. Till March 16, 2006 it received 1138 MW capacity.
In 2009 Hungary tendered for 410 MW of new wind capacity. It received 68 bids totalling 1100 MW capacity, but later the Hungarian Energy Office cancelled it.

List of wind farms

Biggest owners
MVM Group: 
More than 5 MWp: Felsőzsolca, Paks, Pécs, Visonta
Less than 5 MWp: 
MET Power: Százhalombatta
Solar Markt: Csepreg, Kőszeg, Söjtör, Vép
ALTEO Group: Balatonberény (7 MWp), Nagykőrös (7 MWp), Monor (4 MWp)

See also

Renewable energy in Hungary
Energy in Hungary
List of renewable energy topics by country
Wind power in the European Union
European Wind Energy Association
Global Wind Energy Council

References

External links

Hungarian Wind Energy Industry Company

 
Hungary